Middle Island is a town located on the west coast of Saint Kitts island, in Saint Kitts and Nevis.

Geography
It is the capital of Saint Thomas Middle Island Parish.

Its current population is estimated at 657, a figure which includes the nearby village of Lambert's.

History
It is the home of the tomb of Thomas Warner, who established the first British colony in the Caribbean on the island of Saint Kitts.

Populated places in Saint Kitts and Nevis
Saint Thomas Middle Island Parish